Todarodinae is a squid subfamily in the family Ommastrephidae.

Genera

 Genus Martialia
 Martialia hyadesii, sevenstar flying squid
 Genus Nototodarus
 Nototodarus gouldi, Gould's flying squid
 Nototodarus hawaiiensis, Hawaiian flying squid
 Nototodarus sloanii, Wellington flying squid or New Zealand arrow squid
 Genus Todarodes
 Todarodes angolensis, Angola flying squid
 Todarodes filippovae, Antarctic flying squid
 Todarodes pacificus, Japanese flying squid or Japanese common squid
 Todarodes pusillus, little flying squid
 Todarodes sagittatus, European flying squid
 Genus Todaropsis
 Todaropsis eblanae, lesser flying squid

References

External links

Squid
Gliding animals
Protostome subfamilies